Musical Moments is the eighth leader album by Japanese pianist Junko Onishi, released on July 23, 2009 in Japan.

Track listing

Personnel
Junko Onishi - Piano
Yosuke Inoue - Bass (M1,3,4,6-8)
Gene Jackson - Drums (M1,3,4,6-8)
Reginald Veal - Bass (M10)
Herlin Riley - Drums (M10)

Production
Co-Producer - Junko Onishi
Executive Producer - Hitoshi Namekata
Recording and Mixing Engineer - Tomoo Suzuki (M1-9), Akihiko Kurazono (M10), Masashi Okada (M10), Tomomi Shimura (M10), Shingo Okubo (M10), Toshiharu Yamauchi (M10)
Assistant Engineer - Kiyoshi Nishiyama (M1-9), Masanori Hata (M1-9)
Mixing Engineer - Tomoo Suzuki
Mastering engineer - Machiko Suzue
Piano tuning - Norihito Onuma
Cover Photograph - Kunihiro Takuma
Hair & Make up - Hiroyuki Mikami
Styling - Nobuko Shindo
Art director - Kaoru Taku
A&R - Yoshiko Tsuge

External links
JazzInJapan Junko Onishi “Musical Moments” (Somethin’ Else 2009)

2009 albums
Junko Onishi albums